James F. Templeton was a Scottish amateur footballer who played as a left half in the Scottish League for Queen's Park. He represented the Scottish League XI.

Career statistics

Honours 
Queen's Park
 Glasgow Cup: 1898–99

References

External links
 

Year of birth missing
Scottish footballers
Scottish Football League players
Association football wing halves
Queen's Park F.C. players
Place of death missing
Date of death missing
Place of birth missing
Scottish Football League representative players